Show Me the Money was a live afternoon game show presented by Louise Noel (with the exception of three shows presented by Alice Beer when Louise was ill) which aired on Channel 4 in the UK and ran for 2 seasons from Monday to Friday between 6 September 1999 and 17 November 2000. It was produced by Princess Productions for Channel 4.

The show won the Royal Television Society Daytime Show of the Year.

Synopsis

The premise of the game was for teams to make as much money as possible from an imaginary £100,000 on the Stock Market by the end of the season. There were five active teams at any point, each having a day of the week to show their imaginary portfolios and state what they were buying and selling. If a team ever had below £90,000 in their imaginary pot at the beginning of their show they were kicked off and a new team brought in to replace them.

Each team consisted of three members of the public with little or no knowledge of the Stock Exchange. Tom Winnifrith, a professional investor, was on hand to give the teams advise with their portfolio. Prior to deciding on what they would buy or sell a Managing Director of a business listed on the Stock Exchange would come on and give a 60-second pitch to the team.

In addition to the three teams, there was an extra team called "the baby boomers" which were three babies that were given some random letter blocks which, when picked, triggered a buy of that stock and this introducing a random element to the game.

There was an online game section open to the public during the show which had a £10,000 prize each day.

Format

The show was very slick with many graphical representations of the Stock Exchange presented in real time. Often, a team's stock rose or fell during the course of the show. Tom Winnifrith had a strong understanding of many of the companies chosen by the team and would give out facts and trivia at an easily understood level. Louise Noel would have informal chats to the teams and the Managing Director guests which brought a comfortable and accessible angle to the show.

Series Guide

External links
 'Royal Television Society list of awards' - PDF of every award given by the RTS
 'IMDB page' - Show Me The Money on Imdb
 'Princess Productions SMTM page'
 'Webchat log with Louise Noel' - Channel 4 log 1
 'Webchat log with Louise Noel' - Channel 4 log 2

1990s British game shows
2000s British game shows
1999 British television series debuts
2000 British television series endings
Channel 4 original programming
Television series by Endemol
English-language television shows